The Sandman Companion (1999) is a book by Hy Bender and published by Vertigo, an imprint of DC Comics, providing annotations and commentary on Neil Gaiman's comic book series The Sandman.

The book relies heavily on original interviews with Gaiman about the comic and was published by Vertigo, serving as an official annotation and commentary for the series.

1999 books
Books about comics
Companion